Juan Valdez was Governor of Texas and Coahuila, and lieutenant general and alcalde (mayor) of the presidio and villa of Bexar in 1714 and 1716.

Biography 
Juan Valdez was chosen governor of Texas and Coahuila twice: in 1714 and in 1716. He was mayor of the presidio of villa of Bexar (San Antonio, Texas) in 1720. During his mayoralty in Bexar, he established a mission in a place of San Jose and San Miguel de Aguayo, under orders of the viceroy of New Spain, even after that Antonio de Olivares filed a petition asking that the mission not be done in Zacatecas (in modern Mexico) as it had been planned to establish a new mission.

References

Governors of Spanish Texas
1710s in Texas